Olivella lepta is a species of small sea snail, marine gastropod mollusk in the subfamily Olivellinae, in the family Olividae, the olives.  Species in the genus Olivella are commonly called dwarf olives.

Description

Distribution
This marine species occurs off Southern Japan and off Taiwan.

References

lepta
Gastropods described in 1835